Hopeless Records is an American independent record label in Van Nuys, California.

History
Hopeless Records was founded in 1993 by Louis Posen. The label's artists are generally considered to fall under the genres of punk rock, pop punk, post-hardcore, and alternative rock, but some also include elements of heavy metal. Some of their best-known artists include All Time Low, Sum 41, Neck Deep, Avenged Sevenfold, Thrice, Yellowcard, Anarbor, Taking Back Sunday, Silverstein, We Are the In Crowd, Bayside, the Used, the Wonder Years, the Human Abstract and Enter Shikari.

In July 2008, Hopeless Records announced that it had launched a new imprint, P Is for Panda. It was originally started in 2007 as a clothing line by The Militia Group founder Chad Pearson. The label released its first album, a various artists compilation in August 2008.

Notable artists

Current

Aaron West and the Roaring Twenties
Anthony Raneri
Bayside
Destroy Boys
Doll Skin
Fame On Fire
Foxing
Grabbitz
Illuminati Hotties
LØLØ
New Found Glory
NOAHFINNCE
Phem
Pinkshift
Pvris
remy
Scene Queen
Stand Atlantic
Sullivan King
Sum 41
Taking Back Sunday
Tigers Jaw
Tiny Moving Parts
Trash Boat
Travie McCoy
Trophy Eyes
Vaines
What's Eating Gilbert
With Confidence 
The Wonder Years
Zeph

Past

88 Fingers Louie (active)
Against All Authority (active)
Air Dubai (status unknown)
All Time Low (active with Fueled by Ramen)
Amber Pacific (active with Digitally Sound Records and Straight 8 Entertainment)
Anarbor (active)
Atom And His Package (active)
Avenged Sevenfold (active with Capitol Records)
Circa Survive  (hiatus)
Coldrain (active with Warner Music Japan)
Common Rider  (status unknown)
Cruel Hand (status unknown)
Damion Suomi and the Minor Prophets (status unknown)
The Dangerous Summer (active with Rude Records)
Digger (active again as of 2015)
Dillinger Four (active with Fat Wreck Chords)
Driver Friendly (status unknown)
Emarosa (active with Out of Line Music)
Enter Shikari (independent)
Ever We Fall (disbanded)
Fifteen (disbanded)
Funeral Oration (disbanded)
Guttermouth (active with Rude Records)
Hands Like Houses (status unknown)
Have Mercy (status unknown)
Heckle (disbanded)
The Human Abstract (disbanded)
Hundredth (status unknown)
Jeff Ott (status unknown)
Kaddisfly (active with Hopeless subsidiary Sub City Records)
Lotus Eater (disbanded)
Mêlée (status unknown)
Milk Teeth (disbanded)
Moose Blood (hiatus)
Mustard Plug (active with No Idea Records)
Neck Deep (independent)
Nural (disbanded)
The Queers (active with Asian Man Records)
The Ready Set (status unknown)
Roam (status unknown)
Samiam (active with Pure Noise Records)
Satanic Surfers (active)
Scared of Chaka (status unknown)
Selby Tigers (disbanded)
Silverstein (active with UNFD)
Somos (status unknown)
Story Untold (actively independent)
SycAmour (status unknown)
Sylar (status unknown)
There for Tomorrow (disbanded)
Thrice (active with Epitaph Records)
Tonight Alive (status unknown)
The Used (active with Big Noise Records)
Waterparks (active with Fueled by Ramen)
We Are The In Crowd (active)
WSTR (active)
Yellowcard (active)

See also
 List of record labels

References

External links
 Official website

American independent record labels
Record labels established in 1993
Punk record labels